Mazurkas, Op. 33 are a set of four Mazurkas for piano by Frédéric Chopin, composed and published in 1838.

Analysis

Mazurka in G minor, Op. 33, No. 1

Mazurka in G-sharp minor, Op. 33, No. 1, the opening mazurka of the set, has a tempo marking of Lento. This mazurka has an emotional melody, accompanied in the left hand with a waltz pattern. The mood changes many times throughout the piece, and to good effect. This intimate piece is occasionally considered less complicated than many of Chopin's other mazurkas.

Mazurka in D major, Op. 33, No. 2

Mazurka in D major, Op. 33, No. 2, the second piece of the collection, is one of the most popular mazurkas. It has a fast tempo and strong irregular accents.

The piece begins with the happy and joyful main theme, decorated with ornaments. After a second theme is introduced, the main theme is repeated for a second time. The mazurka concludes with a separate coda section that introduces a new theme, this concludes with a melody ascending high into the upper register.

An average performance of this mazurka lasts around 3 minutes.

Mazurka in C major, Op. 33, No. 3

Mazurka in C major, Op. 33, No. 3, the third of the set, has an expression marking of semplice (see:Tempo#Italian tempo markings). This miniature is simple and warm, showing a different approach to the mazurka genre. Slightly accented second beats are used to keep the mazurka characteristics.

Mazurka in B minor, Op. 33, No. 4

Mazurka in B minor, Op. 33, No. 4, the final mazurka of the set, is one of the longest mazurkas at nearly 5 minutes in length. The piece is written in an ABABCA structure, similar to a rondo form.

The piece begins with a captivating main melody, decorated with grace notes and trills. This melody is repeated a total of eight times throughout the piece; between it, different melodies appear, but the main melody always returns. A B major section follows the theme, which is the B section. The C section is in B major, which is the parallel key to B minor.

References

External links
[ Mazurkas Op. 33 at Allmusic]
 

1838 compositions
Mazurkas by Frédéric Chopin
Music with dedications